The white-throated grasswren (Amytornis woodwardi), also known as Yirlinkirrkirr in the local language, is a species of bird in the family Maluridae. It is endemic to northern Australia, found only in West Arnhem Land, in the Northern Territory (NT).

Habitat
The white-throated grasswren is only found on and around the Arnhem Land sandstone massif, between Katherine and Maningrida, covering an area of 

Its natural habitats are subtropical or tropical dry lowland grassland and rocky areas.

Conservation status
Its status is endangered on the IUCN Red List, last assessed in 2022, and in Australia under the federal Environment Protection and Biodiversity Conservation Act 1999, effective November 2014, and in the NT under the Territory Parks and Wildlife Conservation Act 2000.

It is threatened by habitat loss, as it depends on Triodia microstachya (spinifex grass) untouched by fire for at least five years. It is therefore threatened by more frequent bushfires (over 50 in 2021, with climate change playing a role in the increase), leading to inadequate habitat quality and lack of reproductive success. As the bird hops around rather than flies, it is vulnerable to predation by feral cats.

Its total population was estimated at between 5,000 and 10,000  individuals in 1992; no more than 10,000 mature birds in 2011, with numbers continuing to decline through loss of habitat.  it has disappeared from many of the locations where it used to be spotted frequently, such as near Gunlom Falls in Kakadu National Park, Plum Tree Creek, the large population near the East Alligator River.

Conservation strategies
The white-throated grasswren is one of 20 species targeted in the Australian Government's 20 birds by 2020 document, produced as part of its Threatened Species Strategy in 2015.

 Wardekken Indigenous rangers have been working on a project to help conserve the species with non-profit organisation Territory Natural Resource Management, funded by the federal government. One of the strategies used is Indigenous "patchwork" burning methods, which reduces the fuel load that helps to drive bushfires. They managed to spot some in June 2022, by using pre-recorded bird calls to attract the birds.

Taxonomy
The species was identified by Ernst Hartert in 1905. It is in the family Maluridae.

Cultural importance
The bird, known as Yirlinkirrkirr in the local Bininj Kunwok language, is of cultural significance to the Nawarddeken people.

References

External links
BirdLife Species Factsheet.

white-throated grasswren
Birds of the Northern Territory
Endemic birds of Australia
white-throated grasswren
Taxonomy articles created by Polbot
Taxa named by Ernst Hartert